Howling, For the Nightmare Shall Consume is the tenth studio album by American hardcore punk band Integrity. It was released in July 2017 under Relapse Records.

Track listing

Personnel
Personnel per booklet.

Integrity
 Dwid Hellion – vocals, design
 Domenic Romeo – lead guitar, rhythm guitar, lap steel guitar, sitar, bass, organ, noise

Production
 Kevin Bernsten – recording, sound engineer
 Integrity – production
 Brad Boatright – mastering
 Jimmy Hubbard – photography
 Dwid Hellion – artwork

Additional musicians
 Joshy Brettell – drums, percussion
 Greta Thomas – violin (tracks 7, 12)
 Tony Hare – guitars (track 5)
 Deacon Douglas Williams – backing vocals (track 10)
 Monique Harcum – backing vocals(track 10)
 Le Mabuse Kaiser – backing vocals (track 13)
 Damien Romeo – composer, backing vocals (track 12)
 Evelyn Romeo – backing vocals (track 12)
 Reagan Romeo – backing vocals (track 12)
 Lenore McLimans – backing vocals (track 12)
 Lucian Jack McLimans – backing vocals (track 12)
 Roxanne Lichtenstein – backing vocals (track 12)

References

2017 albums
Integrity (band) albums